Arko Pravo Mukherjee (born 19 May 1983), also known as Arko, is an Indian singer-songwriter and music composer who has worked in the Bollywood film industry since 2012. Jism 2 was his debut film as a music composer and lyricist.

Early life
Arko Pravo Mukherjee interned at Calcutta National Medical College before moving in 2008 to Mumbai, to pursue a career in Bollywood film industry as a music director and singer-songwriter.

Filmography

Hindi filmography

Bengali filmography

Telugu filmography

Album(s)

Non-film songs

Arko Pravo Mukherjee is planning to record an English album in Los Angeles soon.
His song 'Reeva' entered the Billboard Dance 50 Charts at number 49.

Notable achievements
 Arko was featured on The Billboard Charts List. Arko's Latest English single "Reeva" was the 45th song on the Billboard Dance Club top 50 Charts.

References

External links
 
 
 

Music directors
Bengali Hindus
Musicians from Kolkata
Indian guitarists
Bengali musicians
Living people
1983 births
Hindi film score composers
21st-century guitarists